Arima may refer to:

Places 
 Arima, a borough and town in eastern Trinidad, Trinidad and Tobago.
 Arima (Cilicia), a town of ancient Cilicia, now in Turkey
 Arima, Syria, a village in the Aleppo Governorate in Syria
 Arima Onsen, a hot springs resort area in Kobe, Japan
 Arima, a place where, according to Hesiod, Echidna dwells

People
Hizen-Arima clan, a Japanese family of daimyo
Arima (surname), a Japanese surname

Acronym
 ARIMA, autoregressive integrated moving average, model in statistics

Others 

 Arima (parliamentary constituency), an electoral district in Trinidad
 Arima (beetle), a genus of leaf beetles (subfamily Galerucinae)
 Arima, a synonym for the moth genus Spargania
 Arima Computer Corporation, a Taiwanese computer hardware manufacturer
 Arima Kinen, horse race in Japan

See also 
 Arimaa, a board game invented by Omar Syed